Peter Vigne Ayerst, DFC (4 November 1920 – 15 May 2014) was a Royal Air force officer and flying ace of the Second World War. He was the last surviving No. 73 Squadron pilot and test pilot from Castle Bromwich Aerodrome.

Early life
Ayerst was born on 4 November 1920 in Westcliff-on-Sea, Essex, England. He was educated at Westcliff High School for Boys, a state grammar school in his home town.

Military career
Ayerst was commissioned into the Royal Air Force on 14 December 1938 as an acting pilot officer on probation. In August 1939, he was posted to No. 73 Squadron RAF to fly Hurricanes. He was regraded to pilot officer on probation on 3 September 1939 and his commission was confirmed on 6 October 1939.

He was sent to France with the squadron and scored his first victory in April 1940. After a spell instructing, when he shared in the destruction of a He 111 with two other instructors, he had postings with both 145 and 243 Squadrons.

In July 1942 he went to North Africa with 33 Squadron, before being promoted to flight commander with 238 Squadron, both postings with further combat success. After a period in South Africa, he returned to the UK, joining 124 Squadron flying Spitfire MkVIIs in defence of the invasion ports, where he scored his final victory; then flew Spitfire MkIXs on bomber escorts to Germany. He later became a Spitfire test pilot at Castle Bromwich with the instruction of Alex Henshaw. After the war, he became one of the most highly regarded wartime instructors in the RAF. His final victory tally stood at 5 destroyed, 1 probable, 3 damaged and 2 further destroyed on the ground. In September 1944, he was awarded the Distinguished Flying Cross.

Later life

Ayerst was involved in a biography about his military experience tilted Spirit of the Blue: A Fighter Pilot's Story. It was published 2004. He died on 15 May 2014 at the age of 93, and is buried in Canterbury, Kent.

References

External links
 2010 interview with BBC News

1920 births
2014 deaths
British World War II fighter pilots
People educated at Westcliff High School for Boys
Recipients of the Distinguished Flying Cross (United Kingdom)
Royal Air Force officers
Royal Air Force pilots of World War II